Glen Mazzara (born July 6, 1967) is an American television producer and writer. He is most well known for his work on The Shield, The Walking Dead and Damien.

Life and career 
An Italian-American, Mazzara was born in Manhattan, New York City, and grew up in Queens. He graduated from St. Francis Preparatory School in 1985. He attended NYU and earned a masters in English. He worked as a hospital administrator in New York before moving to Los Angeles to pursue a career as a writer in 1998.

He was a story editor and writer for the fourth and fifth seasons of Nash Bridges. In 2002, he joined the drama series The Shield as an executive story editor and writer for its first season; was promoted to producer for the second season while continuing to write, to supervising producer for the third season, to co-executive producer for the fourth season and to executive producer for the fifth season; and left midway through the sixth season in 2006. Later in 2006 he was an executive producer on the short-lived series Standoff, and then a co-executive producer on the first season of NBC drama Life.

Mazzara left Life to create and executive produce a new series Crash, based on the Oscar-winning film of the same name, on which he served as head writer and showrunner. He left after one season, but was credited as a consulting producer for the second season premiere.

In 2009, he joined the medical drama series Hawthorne for two seasons as executive producer and writer. In 2010, he wrote his first of several episodes of the AMC series The Walking Dead, episode 1.5: "Wildfire.

On July 27, 2011, it was reported that Mazzara had taken over as showrunner of The Walking Dead after Frank Darabont dropped out of the position. Mazzara left this role following season 3. After The Walking Dead, he signed an overall deal with Fox Television Studios in 2013.

Glen Mazzara is the Creator, Executive Producer, and Showrunner of A&E's series, Damien, based on the classic horror film, The Omen.

On April 15, 2019, Mazzara joined several other writers in firing their agents as part of the WGA's stand against the ATA and the practice of packaging.

Filmography

Producer

Writer

References

External links 

  Master Class with Glen Mazzara at 2012 Banff World Media Festival
  Q&A with Glen Mazzara at 2012 Banff World Media Festival

American male screenwriters
American television writers
American writers of Italian descent
Living people
New York University alumni
Writers from Manhattan
People from Queens, New York
1967 births
Showrunners
American male television writers
Screenwriters from New York (state)